Pinto Rustlers is a 1936 American western film directed by Harry S. Webb and starring Tom Tyler, George Walsh and Al St. John.

Synopsis
A young cowboy's parents are killed by a gang of rustlers. He seeks revenge and infiltrates the gang in order to gain enough evidence to hang them.

Cast
 Tom Tyler as Tom Evans posing as Tom Dawson  
 George Walsh as Nick Furnicky  
 Al St. John as Mack  
 Marie Burton as Ann Walton 
 Earl Dwire as Bud Walton  
 William Gould as Inspector  
 George Chesebro as Henchman Spade  
 Roger Williams as Deputy posing as Lugo  
 Bud Osborne as Henchman Buck  
 Murdock MacQuarrie as Ed Walton
 Slim Whitaker as Sheriff

References

Bibliography
 Pitts, Michael R. Poverty Row Studios, 1929–1940: An Illustrated History of 55 Independent Film Companies, with a Filmography for Each. McFarland & Company, 2005.

External links
 

1936 films
1936 Western (genre) films
1930s English-language films
American Western (genre) films
Films directed by Harry S. Webb
Reliable Pictures films
American black-and-white films
Films directed by Robert Emmett Tansey
1930s American films